The avian genus Quiscalus contains seven of the 11 species of grackles, gregarious passerine birds in the icterid family. They are native to North and South America.

The genus was named and described by French ornithologist Louis Jean Pierre Vieillot in 1816. The type species was subsequently designated as the common grackle (Quiscalus quiscula) by English zoologist George Robert Gray in 1840. The genus name comes from the specific name Gracula quiscula coined by Swedish naturalist Carl Linnaeus for the common grackle. From where Linnaeus obtained the word is uncertain, but it may come from the Taíno word quisqueya, meaning "mother of all lands", for the island of Hispaniola.

The genus contains six extant species and one extinct species:

References

External links

Quiscalus videos, photos and sounds on the Internet Bird Collection

 
Bird genera
Taxa named by Louis Jean Pierre Vieillot